Joey and the Twisters was an American twist group, formed from remnants of the original Royal Teens around 1961. The group was led by Teens vocalist Joey Villa (aka Joe Francovilla), along with several other members from the local Manhattan doo-wop scene. The band played regularly at the Peppermint Lounge in Manhattan, alongside Joey Dee and the Starliters and other acts.

The Twisters never released an album, but did release several singles on Duel Records, including remakes of Bobby Darin's "Jailer, Bring me Water," Bobby Freeman's "Do You Want to Dance," and "Bony Maronie," and penned "Peppermint Twist Time" in honor of the club that gave them a home.

They did launch on a national tour, the highlight of which was playing the Dream Room in New Orleans, and they appeared on Dick Clark's American Bandstand on New Year's Day, 1962.

The group dissolved as the twist fell out of fashion. Joey Villa continued playing as a solo artist. Bob Azzara and Louis Burgio, along with friend Flip Cesario, who briefly played with the Royal Teens, later formed the band Mardi Gras.

Members
 Joey Villa - Vocals
 Bob Azzara - piano
 Louis Burgio - drums
 Frankie Natale - saxophone
 Rich Malfitano - saxophone
 Flip Cesario - guitar

References

Musical groups from New York City
Doo-wop groups